Sir Bronson James Albery (6 March 1881 – 21 July 1971) was an English theatre director and impresario. Second son of James Albery and Mary Moore, and brother to Irving Albery and Wyndham Albery, he was knighted in 1949 for his services to the theatre. Albery married Una Gwynn Rolleston. The Albery Theatre in London was named in his honour and his elder son, Sir Donald Albery, was also a theatrical impresario.

References

1881 births
1971 deaths
English theatre directors
English theatre managers and producers
Impresarios
Knights Bachelor
People from Kent
20th-century English businesspeople